The Ligas Superiores was one of two leagues that formed part of the Departamental Stage in the Copa Perú of the Peruvian Football Federation (FPF) football league system. The other league at level was the Ligas Departamentales.

A transcendental step was given in the Copa Perú with the official establishment of the Ligas Superiores which did not become as successful as expected.

Format
The Ligas Superiores were composed of a select group of clubs of each department. The champion and runner-up from each league automatically qualifies to their department's Liga Departamental.

History
The Ligas Superiores were officially created in 2009. In 2009, nine the Departmental Federations determined to adopt them: Arequipa, Ayacucho, Cajamarca, Huánuco, Lambayeque, Pasco, Piura, Puno and Tumbes.

As of 2019, only two departments continue to have a Liga Superior, Piura and Tumbes.

Liga Superior de Ancash

Liga Superior de Arequipa

Liga Superior de Ayacucho

Liga Superior de Cajamarca

Liga Superior del Callao

Liga Superior de Cusco

Liga Superior de Huánuco

Liga Superior de Lambayeque

Liga Superior de Pasco

Liga Superior de Piura

Liga Superior de Puno

Liga Superior de Tumbes

See also
List of football clubs in Peru
Peruvian football league system

External links
Ligas Superiores 

 
5